is a railway station located in the city of Sagae, Yamagata Prefecture, Japan, operated by East Japan Railway Company (JR East).

Lines
Shibahashi Station is served by the Aterazawa Line, and is located 22.3 rail kilometers from the terminus of the line at Kita-Yamagata Station.

Station layout
The station has one side platform serving  single bi-directional track. The platform is very short, and can only accommodate two carriages. The station is unattended.

History
Shibahashi Station began operation on 25 December 1951. With the privatization of the JNR on April 1, 1987, the station came under the control of the East Japan Railway Company.

Surrounding area

See also
List of Railway Stations in Japan

References

External links 

  Shibahashi Station (JR East) 

Railway stations in Yamagata Prefecture
Aterazawa Line
Railway stations in Japan opened in 1951
Sagae, Yamagata